Rossfjordstraumen is a village in Senja Municipality in Troms og Finnmark county, Norway. It serves as a community center for the areas around the Rossfjorden and the lake Rossfjordvatnet. In 2009, the village area had 428 residents. Rossfjord Church is located in this village.

History
On 28 March 1968, a Widerøe de Havilland Canada DHC-3 Otter seaplane crashed at Rossfjordstraumen. There were no fatalities, but the aircraft was written off.

References

External links

Villages in Troms
Senja